Dilawar  may refer to:

People
 Dilawar (torture victim) (1979–2002), Afghan tortured to death by American forces
 Dilawar Figar (1926–1998), Urdu poet, known for his poetry and style of presentation
 Dilawar Khan Ghauri (reigned 1401), sultan of Malwa
 Dilawar Mani, Pakistani cricket administrator

Places
 Dilwar (disambiguation)
 Dilawar, Punjab, a village in the Punjab province of Pakistan
 Dilawar Cheema, a town in Gujranwala, Pakistan

Persian masculine given names